Piyush Vedprakash Goyal (born 13 June 1964) is a politician, chartered accountant and cabinet minister of the Government of India having portfolios such as Minister of Textiles, Minister of Commerce and Industry and Minister of Consumer Affairs, Food and Public Distribution. He was elevated to the Cabinet Minister position on 3 September 2017. Currently a Member of Parliament for Rajya Sabha from the state of Maharashtra, he is also the current Leader of the House in Rajya Sabha.

Earlier, he held the post of the National Treasurer of the Bharatiya Janata Party (BJP). He headed the BJP's Information Communication Campaign Committee where he oversaw the publicity and advertising campaign of the party including the social media outreach for the Indian General Elections 2014. Goyal has also held additional charge of Minister of Finance and Corporate Affairs twice in 2018 and 2019. Earlier he was Minister of State (Independent Charge) for Power, Coal, New & Renewable Energy (2014–2017), and Mines (2016–17).

Goyal is the 2018 Carnot Prize Recipient for distinguished contributions to energy policy. He has been allocated the cabinet ministry for Narendra Modi led NDA government in May 2019.

Early life
Goyal was born in Mumbai to Chandrakanta Goyal and Ved Prakash Goyal. His mother was a three-time Bharatiya Janata Party (BJP) Member of Legislative Assembly (MLA) from Maharashtra and his father served as the Union Minister for shipping in the Third Vajpayee ministry from 2001 to 2003. His father also served as the National Treasurer of the BJP for over two decades.

Piyush Goyal is Chartered Accountant and he did Law in Mumbai University. He did his schooling from Don Bosco High School, Matunga.

Career
Goyal started his career as an investment banker and served on the board of India's largest commercial banks, the State Bank of India 2001–2004 and Bank of Baroda 2002–2004 as Government nominee.

Goyal was a member of the Standing Committee on Finance and the Consultative Committee for the Ministry of Defence. An active member of the Managing Committee of Indian Merchants Chamber, he is also involved with NGOs in diverse fields such as tribal education and welfare of the physically challenged (Jaipur Foot).

During his 35-year-long political career, he has served on the National Executive and held several important positions in the BJP including the national treasurer. He was also nominated by the Government of India to the Task Force for Interlinking of Rivers. He was the Dy. Campaign In-charge for the Parliament elections in 1991 and played a key role at the central level in all elections since 2004.

He was elected as the Bharatiya Janata Party candidate from Maharashtra for the Rajya Sabha in 2010.

Minister of State for Coal, Power, New and Renewable Energy (2014–17) 

Goyal became the Minister of State for Power, Coal, New and Renewable Energy in the Modi government in 2014 and undertook multiple initiatives in his term. Under his tenure, India saw a proliferation of renewable energy through the world's largest renewable energy expansion program. Ministry under him accelerated the mission to provide 24X7 reliable electricity to all households and pushed towards the adoption of clean energy. He introduced the Ujwal DISCOM Assurance Yojana (UDAY) to revive debt-ridden power distribution companies and Deen Dayal Upadhyaya Gram Jyoti Yojana (DDUGJY) to improve India's energy access.

He initiated and completed the government program to electrify all the 18,000 remaining unelectrified villages of the country. He was awarded the 2018 Carnot Prize for distinguished contributions to energy policy and work in village electrification by the University of Pennsylvania’s Kleinman Center for Energy Policy. He revised the Government's target of 20 GW of solar power by 2022 to five times (i.e. 100 GW). Along with this, he also helped the cash-strapped state power distribution companies to turn around.

On 5 July 2016, during the second cabinet reshuffle of the Modi ministry, he was included in the cabinet and took over as the Minister of State for Mines (Independent charge) from Narendra Singh Tomar.

Minister of Railways (2017 – 2021) 

Goyal became the Minister of Railways on 3 September 2017 taking charge from Suresh Prabhu. Under his leadership, Indian Railways established a "Zero Accident" railway system and have seen no accidents for the past 22 months. He started 'Plan Bee', a method to prevent elephants from approaching the railway lines. It involves setting up of devices near tracks, which emit the 'buzzing' sound of bees, saving elephants from train accidents.

He launched the first indigenous semi-high speed train Vande Bharat Express between Delhi and Varanasi. In all the mountain railways region of the country, Goyal introduced Vista-Dome coaches, in an attempt to allow the passengers to enjoy the scenery of the hilly terrains. On 27 February 2019, Piyush Goyal announced a Railway Zone for Andhra Pradesh named South Coast Railway with Waltair Division in Andhra Pradesh along with Guntur, Guntakal and Vijayawada Divisions with the headquarters of the zone being in Visakhapatnam, according to the AP Reorganisation Act 2014.

Goyal announced the ‘Clone Train Scheme’, wherein it planned to run a clone train with the train of the same number, to help and provide relief to the waitlisted passengers over heavy passenger traffic routes. For fighting climate change and making plastic-free India, he announced that tea will be sold in environment friendly 'Kulhads' (earthen cups) in place of plastic cups at all railway stations in the country.

From May through August 2018, he was temporarily given additional charge of Ministry of Finance during Arun Jaitley's absence for medical treatment. Goyal presented the 2019 Interim-Union budget of India in the Lok Sabha on 1 February 2019.

Coronavirus Pandemic 
By taking advantage of the COVID-19 lockdown in India, the Indian Railways completed 200 key long pending projects . These projects, according to the Railways officials, included three super critical projects with a combined length of 68 km, three critical projects with a combined length of 45 km, upgradation of the entire 389 km railway line from Jhajha in Bihar to Pandit Deen Dayal Upadhyaya Junction in Uttar Pradesh and a new 82 km port connectivity line to Paradip. During COVID pandemic in India, Goyal got Indian Railways to developed anti-COVID-19 coach to contain the spread of coronavirus. This anti-COVID-19 coach had hands-free water tanks and flushes; copper-coated handles and locks.

During the second wave of the pandemic in India, to overcome the scarcity of Oxygen, the railways under him decided to run Oxygen Express to transport medical oxygen as well as the oxygen cylinders. As of 7 May 2021, the Indian Railways ran "40 Oxygen Express with 161 tankers to deliver a record load of 2,511 metric tonnes of liquid medical oxygen."

Minister of Commerce & Industry (2019 – present) 
In May 2019, Goyal continued at the Ministry of Railways and got the Ministry of Commerce and Industry. He aims to discard restrictive States Government policies pertaining to License Raj, Land Permissions, Foreign Investment Proposals, and Environmental Clearances. In a bid to systematise the onboarding process of retailers on e-commerce platforms, Goyal directed the Department for Promotion of Industry and Internal Trade (DPIIT)  to utilise the Open Network for Digital Commerce (ONDC) to set protocols for cataloging, vendor discovery and price discovery. Goyal aims to provide equal opportunities to all marketplace players to make optimum use of the e-commerce ecosystem in the larger interest of the country and its citizen. Under Goyal's leadership in Jan 2021 India jumped 14 spots in World Bank's Ease of Doing Business rankings taking India to 63rd spot amongst 190 countries.

In a bid to Atmanirbhar Bharat, Goyal launched One District One Product (ODOP) initiative to fuel the economic growth and generate employment within India. The objective of ODOP is to convert each district of India into an export hub by identifying products with export potential in the respective district. Goyal inaugurated ‘Prarambh’ International Summit, an initiative by Startup India in New Delhi.

Leader of the House in Rajya Sabha (2021 - present) 

In July 2021, Goyal was appointed the Leader of the House in Rajya Sabha succeeding his colleague Thawar Chand Gehlot.

Deputy Leader of the House (2019 - 2021) 
In June 2019, he was appointed the Deputy Leader of the House in Rajya Sabha.

Minister of Consumer Affairs, Food & Public Distribution (2020 – present) 

After the demise of Ram Vilas Paswan, he took over the additional charge of the Ministry of Consumer Affairs Food & Public Distribution on 9 October 2020.

After taking charge, Goyal announced the strengthening and modernising of the Food Corporation of India. He also emphasised that the procurement system at Minimum support price (MSP) will continue and Food Corporation of India (FCI) will be committed to serving farmers. To ensure that all the migrant labor community can draw their allotted ration anywhere in the country Goyal called for speedy implementation of One Nation One Ration Scheme. At the 3rd Governing Council meeting of the Bureau of Indian Standards (BIS), Goyal directed to cut quality testing charges for MSMEs, Startups and Women Entrepreneurs.

Goyal also directed the Department of Consumer Affairs to focus and ensure on quality and quantity of products, processes and services to the consumers by way of the BIS Act, 2016 and Legal Metrology Act, 2009.

Personal life 
He is married to Seema Goyal, an active social worker, and they have two children. His son Dhruv Goyal works at Evercore (investment banking) while his daughter Radhika Goyal works at Bain (consulting).

References

External links
 
 

1964 births
Living people
People from Haryana
Politicians from Mumbai
Indian accountants
Rajya Sabha members from Maharashtra
Union ministers of state of India with independent charge
Bharatiya Janata Party politicians from Maharashtra
Narendra Modi ministry
Rajya Sabha members from the Bharatiya Janata Party
Railway Ministers of India
Finance Ministers of India
Ministers for Corporate Affairs
Ministers of Power of India
Commerce and Industry Ministers of India